Hirangaon is a hamlet in the Firozabad Tehsil of Firozabad district of Uttar Pradesh in India.
This Jaroli Khurd comes under the Gram Panchayat. People from many communities reside in this village, called a village of Brahmins, because of being settled away from densely settled settlement and being open and peaceful, green environment and traffic problem. These are Brahmin, Jatav, Barber, Kori, Kachi, Valmiki, Brahmins, Tiwari, Srooti, Mudgal, Pathak, Joshi, Tenuguriya and Dixit are the people of Gauta. Deer village is divided into four mohallas, in which "Tiwari Mauhalla, Sototi Mauhalla, Dikshit Mauhalla, And jatav mohalla " All the people of the community live together with Ghanish Premata. Firozabad is located approximately 16 kilometers east of the district headquarters. Most of the people here were employed in government service but most of the time now depend on factories / factories. Currently, the person who is employed in the government service is residing in the city outside the village. Pin Code of Hirangaon is 283103, here it is established by the Government of India for the arrival of letters. Hirngav post office also is head-and post office firozabad is located. Which is approximately 8 kg meters.

There are temples of goddesses all around Hirangaon, which protect against the plight of this village. If a person dies in this village then that person Kada Samskar is performed by sitting in it like yoga action while other villages There is no such practice in other villages by the cremation of any deceased person, this tradition is done in the person's progenitor sages of the village of Hirangaon. Free of sage sage in ancient times because connecting Yogsadna your yoga practice would be absorbed into Sage Exchange in response to Hirngav Narki Tehsil, South Fatehabad in West Tundla tehsil and former Shikohabad the tehsil. Agra mandal is 42 km away, in which many Mughal historical monuments are decorated.

References 

Villages in Firozabad district